Patissa melitopis is a moth in the family Crambidae. It was described by Edward Meyrick in 1933. It is found in the Democratic Republic of the Congo, where it has been recorded from Katanga, West Kasai and Orientale.

References

Moths described in 1933
Schoenobiinae